Murdunna is a rural locality in the local government area (LGA) of Tasman in the South-east LGA region of Tasmania. The 2016 census recorded a population of 309 for the state suburb of Murdunna.
It is a small town at the head of King George Sound, a narrow bay opening off Norfolk Bay. Murdunna is approximately halfway down the Forestier Peninsula on the Arthur Highway to Port Arthur. It is around 6 metres (20 feet) above sea level. 

Population increases in the summer months, and it is becoming increasingly popular with people from Hobart who are looking for weekend getaways. Many houses are owned by non-residents who use them as holiday homes. The name Murdunna is believed to come from a local Aborginal word meaning "place of the stars".

Tourism is a major source of income, although forestry was and still continues to be a major employer. Many inhabitants commute to Hobart on a daily basis with improved roads.

History
Murdunna was gazetted as a locality in 1967.
Murdunna Post Office opened on 1 June 1910 and closed in 1969.

Geography
The waters of the Tasman Sea form the eastern boundary, and Norfolk Bay the western.

Road infrastructure
Route A9 (Arthur Highway) runs through from north-west to south.

References

Towns in Tasmania
Forestier Peninsula
Localities of Tasman Council